Jalwa Four 2 Ka 1 is an Indian television reality dance show produced by Bonnie Jain Productions. First broadcast in 2008, it airs on the Indian general entertainment channel 9X. Jalwa Four 2 Ka 1 - a mega show featuring a galaxy of stars, celebrity judges and popular hosts in a show that is an engrossing blend of song, dance and comedy. The show  brings together—as four opposing captains—Mika, Rakhi Sawant, Shakti Kapoor & Shweta Tiwari, and is hosted by versatile actor Ali Asgar and popular TV star Divyanka Tripathi. The celebrity judges, gorgeous Bollywood actor Mahima Chaudhry and actor-director Satish Kaushik. The show also features 12 popular TV stars, who are divided in three talent pools of Singing, Dancing & Comedy. Twinkle Bajpai, Amit Tandon, Sandeep Acharya and Rajeshwari Sachdeva comprise the Singing pool, while Khayali, Kashmira Shah, Krushna Abhishek and Purbi Joshi form the Comedy pool and Tanaz & Bakthiyaar Irani, Gaurav Khanna and Shubhangi Atre will hold the Dancing flag high.

The Captains choose their respective teams from the talent pool of these 12 celebrities, but going forward they will be forced to play a strategic game against each other as they trade team members in their bid for the JALWA title.

Judges 
Mahima Choudhry
Satish Kaushik

Hosts 
Ali Asgar
Divyanka Tripathi

Contestants

Captains 
Mika Singh
Rakhi Sawant
Shakti Kapoor
Shweta Tiwari

Singing Pool 
 Twinkle Bajpai
 Amit Tandon
 Sandeep Acharya
 Rajeshwari Sachdev

Comedy Pool 
Khayali
Kashmera Shah
Krushna Abhishek
Purbi Joshi

Dancing Pool 
 Tanaaz Irani
 Bakhtiyaar Irani
 Gaurav Khanna
 Shubhangi Atre

References 

9X (TV channel) original programming
2008 Indian television series debuts
2009 Indian television series endings
Indian dance television shows
Indian reality television series